The title Footballer of the Year (German: Fußballer des Jahres) has been awarded in Germany since 1960. Eligible are German players as well as non-German players playing in Germany. In 1996, the title Women's Footballer of the Year (German: Fußballerin des Jahres) was awarded for the first time. Both awards are determined by a poll of German football journalists from the Association of German Sports Journalists (Verband Deutscher Sportjournalisten) and the publication kicker. 

The current titleholders are Christopher Nkunku of RB Leipzig and Lea Schüller of FC Bayern Munich. In 2004, Brazilian Aílton became the first foreign player to attain the honour.

Footballer of the Year

Women's Footballer of the Year

Footballer of the Year for East Germany

From 1963 to 1991, the publication Die Neue Fußballwoche awarded the Footballer of the Year for East Germany award.

East German Women's Footballer of the Year

References

See also

 List of sports awards honoring women
 Football Manager of the Year (Germany)
 German Sportspersonality of the year
 German Volleyball Player of the Year

German football trophies and awards
 
Awards established in 1960
1960 establishments in West Germany
Annual events in Germany
Germany
Awards established in 1996
Germany
Association football player non-biographical articles